The Brock Badgers are the athletics teams that represent Brock University in St. Catharines, Ontario. To date, the Badgers have won 41 National Championships and 78 Ontario Championships, and are members of the OUA, U Sports, CUFLA, CURC, OIWFA and OUBHL.

Championships

Canadian Championships

Provincial Championships

Hosting 
 Brock men's hockey hosts the RBC Steel Blade Classic.
 Brock men's basketball hosts RBC Classic.
 Brock men's and women's basketball host the Peninsula Hoops Classic each year versus Niagara College. All proceeds go to the United Way of Canada.

Notable former Brock Badgers 
 Michelle Fazzari (Women's Wrestling) Team Canada
 Jasmine Mian (Women's Wrestling) Team Canada
 Eric Woefl (Men's Rowing) Team Canada
 Tim Schrijver (Men's Rowing) Team Canada
 Ray Barkwill (Men's Rugby) Team Canada
 Marty Calder (Wrestling) 2-Time Olympian, Olympic Coach 
 Iain Brambell (Rowing) Olympic Medallist
 Ryan Del Monte (Men's Hockey) Pro Hockey Player ECHL & Germany
 Jessica MacDonald (Wrestling) 3-Time World Medallist
 Sean Pierson (Wrestling / Baseball) UFC Fighter
 Andrew Tinnish (Baseball) Toronto Blue Jays Assistant GM
 Tonya Verbeek (Wrestling) 3-Time Olympic Medallist
 Elisabeth Walker-Young (Swimming) Multiple Paralympic Gold Medallist
 Shawn Williams (Men's Lacrosse) NLL star (first lacrosse player inducted into Brock Hall of Fame)
 Logan Thompson(Men's Hockey) Vegas Golden Knights Goalie

Retired Jerseys 
Men's Basketball
 #50 Ken Murray
 #9 Kevin Doran
 #31 David Picton
 #44 Kevin Stienstra
 #4 Brad Rootes

Men's Hockey
 #6 Dave Burt
 #24 Vince Scott

Women's Hockey
 #9 Jessica Fickel

All-Time Leading Scorers 
 David Picton (Men's Basketball)
 Jodie Ebeling (Women's Basketball)
 Darren Macoretta (Men's Hockey)
 Jessica Fickel (Women's Hockey)
 Ally Fast (All-Time Assists) (Women's Volleyball)
 Shawn Williams (Men's Lacrosse)

Awards and honours
U Sports Athlete of the Month, March 2020: Samantha Keltos, Basketball

Athletes of the Year
This is an incomplete list

Notes

Sources
 Brock Athletics Mission Statement
 Brock Athletics Athletes of the Year
 Brock Athletics Hall of Fame

External links
Official website

Brock University athletics
Brock University
U Sports teams